Kelly Holland is the former CEO and owner of Penthouse Global Media Inc., as well as a director and producer.

Career
A former mainstream documentarian, Holland directed her first adult film in 1994 under an exclusive contract with Vivid Entertainment. She went on to direct films for other companies, including the award-winning 22-volume series Naked Hollywood for Adam & Eve Pictures. She became head of production for Playgirl TV in 2005, and appeared in several mainstream media outlets as the company's spokesperson.

Holland is the founder of Chick Media, a multimedia corporation that produces erotic programming for women. In 2009, she became the executive producer of Penthouse Films.

In 2016, Holland became the CEO and owner of Penthouse Global Media.  She is responsible for a complete overhaul of the brand and its properties. In addition to overseeing all video production, she is also responsible for the company's ten satellite channels in 100 countries, product licensing, international publications, and the Penthouse Clubs.

Awards
 2008 Feminist Porn Award – Sexiest Straight Film – My Sex Therapist.com: The First Sessions
 2011 Venus Award – Business Woman of the Year
 2017 AVN Hall of Fame inductee – Performers and directors

References

External links

Kelly Holland at the Adult Film Database

American pornographic film directors
American pornographic film producers
Women pornographic film directors
Living people
Year of birth missing (living people)
Penthouse (magazine) people